La colt era il suo Dio (internationally released as God Is My Colt .45) is a 1972 Italian Spaghetti Western directed by Luigi Batzella. In this film Batzella uses scenes of two Spaghetti Westerns he previously directed, Anche per Django le carogne hanno un prezzo and Paid in Blood.

Cast 
 Jeff Cameron as Captain Mike Jackson
 Krista Nell as Mary
 Donald O'Brien as Collins
 Gino Turini as James Klinger (as John Turner)
 Gianfranco Clerici as Manuel (as Mark Davis)
 Attilio Dottesio as Sheriff Bill Harris

References

External links

God Is My Colt .45 at Variety Distribution

1972 films
Spaghetti Western films
1972 Western (genre) films
1970s Italian films